Kin Moy is an American mixed martial artist. He competed in the bantamweight and featherweight divisions.

Mixed martial arts record

|-
| Win
| align=center| 12–4
|Tateki Matsuda
|Decision (unanimous)
|Cage Titans 47
|
|align=center| 3
|align=center| 5:00
|Plymouth, Massachusetts, United States
|
|-
| Win
| align=center| 11–4
|Shawn Rall
|KO (punches)
|Cage Titans 45
|
|align=center| 1
|align=center| 1:50
|Plymouth, Massachusetts, United States
|
|-
| Win
| align=center| 10–4
|Raymond Yanez
|TKO (punches)
|Cage Titans 44
|
|align=center| 1
|align=center| 2:01
|Plymouth, Massachusetts, United States
|
|-
|Loss
|align=center|9–4
|Jay Perrin
|Decision (unanimous)
|Cage Titans 42
|
|align=center| 5
|align=center| 5:00
|Plymouth, Massachusetts, United States
|
|-
| Win
| align=center| 9–3
|Patrick Corrigan
|Submission (rear-naked choke)
|Cage Titans 41
|
|align=center| 3
|align=center| 1:08
|Plymouth, Massachusetts, United States
|
|-
|Loss
|align=center|8–3
|Andre Soukhamthath
|TKO (knee and punches)
|CES MMA 37
|
|align=center| 2
|align=center| 2:32
|Lincoln, Rhode Island, United States
|
|-
| Win
| align=center| 8–2
| Walter Smith-Cotito
| Submission (rear-naked choke)
| Bellator 144
| 
| align=center| 3
| align=center| 3:53
| Uncasville, Connecticut, United States
| 
|-
| Win
| align=center| 7–2
| Blair Tugman
| Submission (triangle choke)
| Bellator 140
| 
| align=center| 3
| align=center| 3:01
| Uncasville, Connecticut, United States
| 
|-
| Loss
| align=center| 6–2
| Joey Gomez
| TKO (punches)
| Classic Entertainment and Sports: CES MMA 28
| 
| align=center| 1
| align=center| 1:29
| Lincoln, Rhode Island, United States
| 
|-
| Win
| align=center| 6–1
| Fernando Perez
| TKO (punches)
| CFX 26: Cage Fighting Xtreme 26
| 
| align=center| 1
| align=center| 2:21
| Taunton, Massachusetts, United States
| 
|-
| Loss
| align=center| 5–1
| Steve Garcia
| Decision (Split)
| Bellator 123
| 
| align=center| 3
| align=center| 5:00
| Uncasville, Connecticut, United States
| 
|-
| Win
| align=center| 5–0
| Andre Soukhamthath
| Decision (unanimous)
| Classic Entertainment and Sports: CES MMA 21
| 
| align=center| 3
| align=center| 5:00
| Lincoln, Rhode Island, United States
| 
|-
| Win
| align=center| 4–0
| Kurt Chase-Patrick
| Submission
| VCS: Victory Combat Sports
| 
| align=center| 1
| align=center| 1:00
| Dorchester, Massachusetts, United States
| 
|-
| Win
| align=center| 3–0
| Dinis Paiva
| Submission (guillotine choke)
| CES MMA: Path to Destruction
| 
| align=center| 2
| align=center| 0:57
| Lincoln, Rhode Island, United States
| 
|-
| Win
| align=center| 2–0
| Hassan Mahmood
| TKO (punches)
| CFX 22: Winter Blast
| 
| align=center| 2
| align=center| 1:27
| Plymouth, Massachusetts, United States
| 
|-
| Win
| align=center| 1–0
| Joshua Beauparlant
| Submission (armbar)
| Cage Titans 12: Glory
| 
| align=center| 1
| align=center| 2:45
| Boston, Massachusetts, United States
|

Mixed martial arts amateur record

|-
| Win
| align=center| 6–1
| Luis Ramos
| Technical Submission (triangle choke)
| AFO: The Perfect Storm
| 
| align=center| 2
| align=center| 1:47
| Revere, Massachusetts, United States
| 
|-
| Win
| align=center| 5–1
| Matt Doherty
| Decision (unanimous)
| Cage Titans 5: Vendetta
| 
| align=center| 3
| align=center| 3:00
| Boston, Massachusetts, United States
| 
|-
| Loss
| align=center| 4–1
| Rico DiSciullo
| TKO (punches)
| AFO: Night of Champions 3
| 
| align=center| 1
| align=center| 2:21
| Mansfield, Massachusetts, United States
| 
|-
| Win
| align=center| 4–0
| Dat Tran
| Decision (unanimous)
| AFO: Summer Brawl
| 
| align=center| 3
| align=center| 3:00
| Mansfield, Massachusetts, United States
| 
|-
| Win
| align=center| 3–0
| Mike Campanella
| KO (head kick)
| AFO: Last Man Standing 2
| 
| align=center| 1
| align=center| 1:41
| Randolph, Massachusetts, United States
| 
|-
| Win
| align=center| 2–0
| Jesse Penny
| TKO (punches)
| AFO: Clash of the Titans
| 
| align=center| 2
| align=center| 1:17
| Braintree, Massachusetts, United States
| 
|-
| Win
| align=center| 1–0
| Theo Desjardin
| Submission (rear-naked choke)
| AFO: Last Man Standing
| 
| align=center| 1
| align=center| N/A
| Braintree, Massachusetts, United States
|

See also
List of male mixed martial artists

References

American male mixed martial artists
Bantamweight mixed martial artists
Featherweight mixed martial artists
Living people
1990 births